Hide & Seek is the debut studio album by Irish singer-songwriter Janet Devlin. It received a limited release via PledgeMusic on 1 July 2013. It received a general release on 9 June 2014 under the new title Running with Scissors, including four original songs as well as reworked versions of some of the songs from Hide & Seek.

Background and composition 

Following her participation in the eighth series of the British X Factor and the X Factor Tour, Devlin started working on her debut studio album.

All of the songs were written in collaboration by Devlin and songwriters including Newton Faulkner, Eliot Kennedy and Jack Savoretti.

The limited release of the album via PledgeMusic included a bonus four-track acoustic EP, Nothing Lost, which was released on 14 August 2013. This EP had additional tracks co-written with Savoretti and Joe Janiak included as well as a cover of her X Factor audition song, "Your Song" by Elton John.

A version of "Delicate" originally included on the EP Nothing Lost was later added to the final track listing for the general release of Hide & Seek.

Singles 
 "Wonderful" was released in November 2013 as the album's lead single. The song peaked at No. 25 on the UK Indie Chart and at No. 3 on the Indie Breakers Chart. Its music video was released on 1 November 2013.

Track listing

 Sources:

Personnel

Musicians
 Janet Devlin – lead vocals
 Jim Jayawardena – piano, keyboards, organ
 Roo Walker – acoustic guitar, electric guitar
 Roberto Mario Ruiz – electric bass
 Doug Harper – drums, percussion
 Eliot Kennedy – backing vocals
 Kat Eaton – backing vocals

Technical personnel
 Eliot Kennedy – production, mixing
 Jim Jayawardena – production, mixing
 James Campbell – engineering
 John Davis – mixing (single version of "Wonderful"), mastering 
 Rosie Hardy – photography, design
 Simon Blois – design

References 

2013 debut albums
Janet Devlin albums